Vikram Seth  (born 20 June 1952) is an Indian novelist and poet. He has written several novels and poetry books. He has won several awards such as Padma Shri, Sahitya Academy Award, Pravasi Bharatiya Samman, WH Smith Literary Award and Crossword Book Award. Seth's collections of poetry such as Mappings and Beastly Tales are notable contributions to the Indian English language poetry canon.

Early life and education
Seth was born on 20 June 1952 in Calcutta. His father, Prem Nath Seth, was an executive of Bata Shoes and his mother, Leila Seth, a barrister by training, became the first female judge of the Delhi High Court and first woman to become Chief Justice of a state High Court in India.

Seth was educated at the all-boys' private boarding school The Doon School  in Dehradun, where he was editor-in-chief of The Doon School Weekly. At Doon, he was influenced by his teacher, the mountaineer Gurdial Singh, who taught him geography and, according to Leila Seth, "guided Vikram in many ways...encouraged him to appreciate Western classical music and instilled in him a love of adventure and daring." Singh later described Seth as an "indefatigable worker, and he maintains without difficulty his distinguished level in studies...he has put in enormous amount of energy in other spheres of school life, in dramatics, in debating, in first aid, in music, and in editing the Doon School Weekly." After graduating from Doon, Seth went to Tonbridge School, England, to complete his A-levels.  Later he read Philosophy, Politics and Economics at Corpus Christi College, Oxford. He then pursued a Ph.D. in Economics at Stanford University though never completed it.

Work and style
Seth has published eight books of poetry and three novels. In 1980, he wrote Mappings, his first book of poetry. The publication of A Suitable Boy, a 1,349-page novel, propelled Seth into the public limelight. It was adapted into a BBC television drama miniseries in 2020. His second novel, An Equal Music, deals with the troubled love-life of a violinist. Seth's work Two Lives, published in 2005, is a memoir of the marriage of his great-uncle and aunt.

In addition to The Golden Gate, Seth has written other works of poetry including Mappings (1980), The Humble Administrator's Garden (1985), All You Who Sleep Tonight (1990) and Three Chinese Poets (1992). His children's book, Beastly Tales from Here and There (1992) consists of 10 stories about animals. He has written a travel book, From Heaven Lake: Travels through Sinkiang and Tibet (1983), an account of a journey through Tibet, China and Nepal. He was also commissioned by the English National Opera to write a libretto based on the Greek legend of Arion and the Dolphin. The opera was performed for the first time in June 1994.

A sequel to A Suitable Boy, A Suitable Girl, was announced in 2009.

Seth's former literary agent Giles Gordon recalled being interviewed by Seth for the position, "Vikram sat at one end of a long table and he began to grill us. It was absolutely incredible. He wanted to know our literary tastes, our views on poetry, our views on plays, which novelists we liked". Seth later explained to Gordon that he had passed the interview not because of commercial considerations, but because unlike the others he was the only agent who seemed as interested in his poetry as in his other writing. Seth followed what he has described as "the ludicrous advance for that book" (£250,000 for A Suitable Boy) with £500,000 for An Equal Music and £1.4 million for Two Lives. He prepared an acrostic poem for his address at Gordon's 2005 memorial service.

Personal life 
Seth is bisexual. He was in a relationship with the violinist Philippe Honoré for ten years and dedicated his novel An Equal Music to him. In 2006, he became a leader of the campaign against Section 377 of the Indian Penal Code, a law against homosexuality. When Section 377 was reinstated in 2013, Seth continued campaigning against the law.

Seth divides his time between the United Kingdom, where he bought and renovated the former home of the Anglican poet George Herbert near Salisbury, and India, where he has a family home in Noida, Uttar Pradesh.

Bibliography

Novels
The Golden Gate (1986)
A Suitable Boy (1993) 
An Equal Music (1999)

Poetry
Mappings  (1980)
The Tale Of Melon City (1981)
The Humble Administrator's Garden (1985)
All You Who Sleep Tonight (1990)
Beastly Tales (1991)
Three Chinese Poets (1992)
The Frog and the Nightingale (1994)
Summer Requiem: A Book of Poems (2015)
A Doctor’s Journal Entry for August 6, 1945
Elephant and the Trapogan

Children's fiction
Arion and the Dolphin (1994)
The Louse and the Mosquito (2020)

Non-fiction
 From Heaven Lake: Travels Through Sinkiang and Tibet (1983)
 Two Lives (2005)
 The Rivered Earth (2011)

Appearances in poetry anthologies
 The Oxford India Anthology of Twelve Modern Indian Poets. Ed. Arvind Krishna Mehrotra. New Delhi: Oxford University Press, 1992.
 The Golden Treasure of Writers Workshop Poetry. Ed. Rubana Huq. Calcutta: Writers Workshop, 2008.

Awards and honours
1983 – Thomas Cook Travel Book Award for From Heaven Lake: Travels Through Sinkiang and Tibet
1985 – Commonwealth Poetry Prize (Asia) for The Humble Administrator's Garden
1988 – Sahitya Akademi Award for The Golden Gate
1993 – Irish Times International Fiction Prize (shortlist) for A Suitable Boy
1994 – Commonwealth Writers Prize (Overall Winner, Best Book) for A Suitable Boy
1994 – WH Smith Literary Award for A Suitable Boy
1999 – Crossword Book Award for An Equal Music
2001 – Order of the British Empire, Commander
2001 – EMMA (BT Ethnic and Multicultural Media Award) for Best Book/Novel for An Equal Music
2005 – Pravasi Bharatiya Samman
2007 – Padma Shri in Literature & Education
2013 – NDTV's 25 Greatest Global Living Legends In India

See also
 List of Indian writers

References

Sources
Chaudhuri, Amit (ed.). "Vikram Seth (born 1952)." The Vintage Book of Modern Indian Literature. New York: Vintage, 2004:508–537.

External links

The Telegraph ("Love split delayed Suitable Boy sequel")
British Council Bio

"Poetic License" by Cynthia Haven, "Stanford Magazine," May/June 1999
BOMB Magazine interview with Vikram Seth by Ameena Meer
Vikram Seth at the Encyclopedia of Fantasy

1952 births
Writers from Kolkata
Living people
Alumni of Corpus Christi College, Oxford
Bisexual poets
Bisexual novelists
The Doon School alumni
Fellows of the Royal Society of Literature
English-language poets from India
Indian emigrants to the United Kingdom
Indian male novelists
Indian travel writers
Indian LGBT poets
Indian LGBT novelists
Indian LGBT rights activists
People educated at Tonbridge School
Recipients of the Padma Shri in literature & education
The Doon School faculty
Bisexual men
Recipients of the Sahitya Akademi Award in English
St. Xavier's Patna alumni
Writers from Patna
Indian male poets
20th-century Indian novelists
21st-century Indian novelists
20th-century Indian poets
21st-century Indian poets
20th-century Indian essayists
21st-century Indian essayists
Indian political writers
Indian children's writers
Novelists from West Bengal
Poets from West Bengal
20th-century Indian male writers
21st-century Indian male writers
Commanders of the Order of the British Empire
Stegner Fellows
Recipients of Pravasi Bharatiya Samman